The Wolf WR5 was a Formula One racing car built for the 1978 Formula One season by the Walter Wolf Racing team. A further example of the model was built, and was given the chassis number WR6. They replaced the successful Wolf WR1 halfway through the 1978 season, trying to challenge the new ground effect Lotus 78.

Complete Formula One World Championship results
(key) (results in bold indicate pole position; results in italics indicate fastest lap) 

20 points were scored using the WR5/6, the remaining points were scored using the Wolf WR1.

References

1978 Formula One season cars
Wolf Formula One cars